Colony of Ceylon may refer to:

Portuguese Ceylon
Dutch Ceylon
British Ceylon